Chukrakly (Suqraqlı) is a rural locality (a selo) in Durasovsky Selsoviet, Chishminsky District, Bashkortostan, Russia. The population was 130 as of 2010. There is 1 street.

Geography 
Chukrakly is located 31 km south of Chishmy (the district's administrative centre) by road. Albeyevo is the nearest rural locality.

References 

Rural localities in Chishminsky District